Verde Independent is a local newspaper serving Cottonwood, Arizona. It was founded in 1948 by Richard Brann, who built the paper's first offices from World War II surplus Quonset huts. The original buildings were located on a river rock foundation in Smelter City, Arizona. Where the first buildings were enlarged and modernized, and they remain the offices for the Verde Independent. It is published three times a week by Western News & Info. It has a circulation of about 3,000.

In 2015, the paper was criticized for running a lightly edited Sheriff's office press release as if it was a news story. The paper said the lack of labeling was an oversight.

References

External links
 

Newspapers published in Arizona
1948 establishments in Arizona
Publications established in 1948
Mass media in Yavapai County, Arizona